Sargocentron hastatum, the red soldierfish or the red squirrelfish is a species of marine fish of the family Holocentridae. It occurs in the eastern Atlantic, from the coasts of Portugal down to Angola, including Cape Verde.

This fish grows to 28 cm maximal length.

Habitat
It occurs in rocky areas and reefs from the shoreline down to 200 m depth.

Uses
This fish is locally caught and marketed fresh or smoked, but not in abundance.

References

hastatum
Fish of West Africa
Fish described in 1829
Taxa named by Georges Cuvier